Fenton, formerly Adams Crossing, is an unincorporated community south-east of Prince Albert, Saskatchewan, Canada. It is a short distance, 13 km west from Birch Hills, Saskatchewan. Fenton is on the banks of the South Saskatchewan River, east of Halcro, Saskatchewan and south-west of the Muskoday First Nation. The Fenton Ferry is operational seasonally and hosts mainly local traffic. Fenton has a long history dating back to Anglo-Metis settlement before the North-West Rebellion. It is situated in the Aspen parkland biome.

The Adams family still live on the family homestead, with Lynn Adams being the latest generation as of 2010.

See also
List of communities in Saskatchewan

References

Further reading
 Whats in Name:The Story Behind Saskatchewan Place Names, Western Producer Prairie Books, E.T. Russell

External links
 Map showing location of Fenton

Unincorporated communities in Saskatchewan